Luis Guillermo Pillot Massó (August 22, 1917 – November 2, 1963), nicknamed "Guido", was a Puerto Rican pitcher in the Negro leagues in the 1940s.

A native of Guayama, Puerto Rico, Pillot made his Negro leagues debut in 1941 with the New York Black Yankees, and played for the Cincinnati Clowns in 1943. He served in the US Navy during World War II, and returned to the New York club for the 1946 season.
 Pillot died in Ponce, Puerto Rico in 1963 at age 46.

References

External links
 and Seamheads

20th-century births
1963 deaths
Cincinnati Clowns players
New York Black Yankees players
20th-century African-American sportspeople